The President of the French Republic was elected on an indirect basis during the Third Republic and Fourth Republic, as well as at the start of the Fifth Republic.

During the Third Republic and Fourth Republic, the officeholder was elected by a combined vote of the Chamber of Deputies (National Assembly in Fourth Republic) and the Senate (Council in Fourth Republic). At the start of the Fifth Republic in 1958, the first presidential election was held using an electoral college consisting of members of the French Parliament, general councils, as well as overseas assemblies, mayors, deputy mayors and city council members. Since then, the presidency has been directly elected with two round system.

Third Republic

1873 election
The 1873 election took place on 24 May following the resignation of incumbent President Adolphe Thiers. At the time of the vote, the Legitimists and Orleanists monarchists held a large majority in Parliament over the Republicans and Bonapartists as a result of the 1871 legislative elections.

1879 election

1885 election

1887 election

1894 election

1895 election

1899 election

1906 election

1913 election

January 1920 election

September 1920 election

1924 election

1931 election

1932 election

1939 election

Fourth Republic

1947 election

1953 election
The elections in December 1953 required thirteen rounds of voting before a candidate reached a majority of the vote. The election was eventually won by René Coty of the National Centre of Independents and Peasants (CNIP), who had only entered in the eleventh round.

Fifth Republic

1958 election
The 1958 election was the first of the French Fifth Republic and took place on 21 December. It was the only French presidential election by the electoral college (gathering the members of the French Parliament, the Conseils Généraux, the overseas assemblies, and tens of thousands of mayors, deputy mayors and city council members). To win, a candidate was required to receive 50% of the vote. This system was used only for this election, and was changed in the 1962 referendum in time for the 1965 presidential election.

|- style="background-color:#E9E9E9;text-align:center;"
! colspan="2" rowspan="2" style="text-align:left;" | Candidates
! rowspan="2" style="text-align:left;" | Parties
! colspan="2" | 1st round
|- style="background-color:#E9E9E9;text-align:center;"
! width="50" | Votes
! width="30" | %
|- style="font-weight:bold"
| style="background-color:" |
| style="text-align:left;" | Charles de Gaulle
| style="text-align:left;" | UNR
| 
| %
|-
| style="background-color:" |
| style="text-align:left;" | Georges Marrane
| style="text-align:left;" | PCF
| 
| %
|-
| style="background-color:" |
| style="text-align:left;" | Albert Châtelet
| style="text-align:left;" | UDF
| 
| %
|-
| colspan="5" style="background-color:#E9E9E9" |
|- style="font-weight:bold"
| colspan="3" style="text-align:left;" | Total
| 
| 100%
|-
| colspan="5" style="background-color:#E9E9E9" | 
|-
| colspan="3" style="text-align:left;" | Valid votes
|  || %
|-
| colspan="3" style="text-align:left;" | Spoilt and null votes
|  || %
|-
| colspan="3" style="text-align:left;" | Turnout
|  || %
|-
| colspan="3" style="text-align:left;" | Abstentions
|  || %
|-
| colspan="3" style="text-align:left;" | Registered voters
| 
| style="background-color:#E9E9E9;" |
|-
| colspan="5" style="background-color:#E9E9E9" | 
|-
| colspan="5" style="text-align:left;" |Official results by Constitutional Council of France.

Source: List of candidates First round result
|}

References

Government of France
Presidential elections in France
Indirect elections